The 2002–03 Montreal Canadiens season was the club's 94th season of play. The club struggled through the season, made a coaching change and did not qualify for the Stanley Cup playoffs.

Regular season
Before the start of the season, many predicted a strong showing from the Canadiens as a result of a healthy Saku Koivu and last season's Hart Memorial Trophy winner, Jose Theodore. The team was .500 for the first two months of the season and showed little improvement in December. Players such as Mariusz Czerkawski, added to the lineup during the summer, and Donald Audette were slow to produce offence for the team, and the two forwards were both sent down for brief stints in the minors. Moreover, Jose Theodore's performances were not up to par with his MVP-winning season of a year earlier. Despite strong seasons from Koivu, Richard Zednik and Yanic Perreault, the Canadiens slid to 11th place in the Eastern Conference in mid-January. This losing streak prompted General Manager Andre Savard to fire head coach Michel Therrien and replace him with Claude Julien, who filled the same role behind the bench of the Habs' American Hockey League (AHL) affiliate, the Hamilton Bulldogs. Despite Julien's arrival, the team was unable to improve its situation and saw their playoff hopes evaporate with a nine-game winless streak that ended in early March. Despite Saku Koivu's 71 points and Richard Zednik's 31 goals, the Canadiens missed the playoffs for the fourth time in five seasons. The Canadiens ended with a record of 30–35–9–8, and former MVP Theodore had a disappointing season with a record of 20–31–6.

The Canadiens finished the regular season tying the Nashville Predators for the fewest short-handed goals scored, with just two.

Final standings

Schedule and results

|- align="center" bgcolor="#CCFFCC"
|1||W||October 11, 2002||4–1 || align="left"| @ New York Rangers (2002–03) ||1–0–0–0||2 || 
|- align="center" bgcolor="#FFBBBB"
|2||L||October 12, 2002||1–6 || align="left"|  Buffalo Sabres (2002–03) ||1–1–0–0||2 || 
|- align="center" bgcolor="#FFBBBB"
|3||L||October 15, 2002||2–6 || align="left"|  Philadelphia Flyers (2002–03) ||1–2–0–0||2 || 
|- align="center" bgcolor="#CCFFCC"
|4||W||October 17, 2002||3–2 || align="left"| @ Detroit Red Wings (2002–03) ||2–2–0–0||4 || 
|- align="center"
|5||T||October 19, 2002||2–2 OT|| align="left"|  Toronto Maple Leafs (2002–03) ||2–2–1–0||5 || 
|- align="center"
|6||T||October 22, 2002||3–3 OT|| align="left"|  Pittsburgh Penguins (2002–03) ||2–2–2–0||6 || 
|- align="center" bgcolor="#FFBBBB"
|7||L||October 24, 2002||2–6 || align="left"| @ Philadelphia Flyers (2002–03) ||2–3–2–0||6 || 
|- align="center" bgcolor="#CCFFCC"
|8||W||October 26, 2002||5–3 || align="left"|  Ottawa Senators (2002–03) ||3–3–2–0||8 || 
|- align="center"
|9||T||October 29, 2002||2–2 OT|| align="left"|  Mighty Ducks of Anaheim (2002–03) ||3–3–3–0||9 || 
|-

|- align="center"
|10||T||November 1, 2002||2–2 OT|| align="left"| @ Carolina Hurricanes (2002–03) ||3–3–4–0||10 || 
|- align="center" bgcolor="#CCFFCC"
|11||W||November 2, 2002||5–2 || align="left"| @ Toronto Maple Leafs (2002–03) ||4–3–4–0||12 || 
|- align="center" bgcolor="#FFBBBB"
|12||L||November 5, 2002||2–5 || align="left"|  St. Louis Blues (2002–03) ||4–4–4–0||12 || 
|- align="center" bgcolor="#CCFFCC"
|13||W||November 7, 2002||3–0 || align="left"|  New York Islanders (2002–03) ||5–4–4–0||14 || 
|- align="center" bgcolor="#CCFFCC"
|14||W||November 9, 2002||3–1 || align="left"|  Los Angeles Kings (2002–03) ||6–4–4–0||16 || 
|- align="center" bgcolor="#FFBBBB"
|15||L||November 12, 2002||2–4 || align="left"|  Dallas Stars (2002–03) ||6–5–4–0||16 || 
|- align="center" bgcolor="#FFBBBB"
|16||L||November 15, 2002||1–5 || align="left"| @ New Jersey Devils (2002–03) ||6–6–4–0||16 || 
|- align="center" bgcolor="#CCFFCC"
|17||W||November 16, 2002||3–1 || align="left"|  New Jersey Devils (2002–03) ||7–6–4–0||18 || 
|- align="center" bgcolor="#CCFFCC"
|18||W||November 18, 2002||5–4 OT|| align="left"|  Pittsburgh Penguins (2002–03) ||8–6–4–0||20 || 
|- align="center" bgcolor="#CCFFCC"
|19||W||November 20, 2002||3–2 OT|| align="left"| @ Pittsburgh Penguins (2002–03) ||9–6–4–0||22 || 
|- align="center" bgcolor="#FFBBBB"
|20||L||November 21, 2002||2–3 || align="left"| @ Ottawa Senators (2002–03) ||9–7–4–0||22 || 
|- align="center" bgcolor="#FFBBBB"
|21||L||November 23, 2002||3–7 || align="left"|  Carolina Hurricanes (2002–03) ||9–8–4–0||22 || 
|- align="center" bgcolor="#CCFFCC"
|22||W||November 26, 2002||3–2 || align="left"|  Atlanta Thrashers (2002–03) ||10–8–4–0||24 || 
|- align="center" bgcolor="#FFBBBB"
|23||L||November 29, 2002||2–4 || align="left"| @ Boston Bruins (2002–03) ||10–9–4–0||24 || 
|- align="center" bgcolor="#FF6F6F"
|24||OTL||November 30, 2002||1–2 OT|| align="left"|  Philadelphia Flyers (2002–03) ||10–9–4–1||25 || 
|-

|- align="center" bgcolor="#FFBBBB"
|25||L||December 4, 2002||1–5 || align="left"| @ Dallas Stars (2002–03) ||10–10–4–1||25 || 
|- align="center" bgcolor="#FF6F6F"
|26||OTL||December 6, 2002||6–7 OT|| align="left"| @ Colorado Avalanche (2002–03) ||10–10–4–2||26 || 
|- align="center" bgcolor="#CCFFCC"
|27||W||December 7, 2002||4–2 || align="left"| @ Phoenix Coyotes (2002–03) ||11–10–4–2||28 || 
|- align="center" bgcolor="#CCFFCC"
|28||W||December 10, 2002||4–2 || align="left"| @ Boston Bruins (2002–03) ||12–10–4–2||30 || 
|- align="center" bgcolor="#FFBBBB"
|29||L||December 12, 2002||2–3 || align="left"|  Tampa Bay Lightning (2002–03) ||12–11–4–2||30 || 
|- align="center" bgcolor="#CCFFCC"
|30||W||December 14, 2002||4–2 || align="left"|  Boston Bruins (2002–03) ||13–11–4–2||32 || 
|- align="center" bgcolor="#CCFFCC"
|31||W||December 16, 2002||3–2 || align="left"| @ Ottawa Senators (2002–03) ||14–11–4–2||34 || 
|- align="center" bgcolor="#FFBBBB"
|32||L||December 17, 2002||1–3 || align="left"|  San Jose Sharks (2002–03) ||14–12–4–2||34 || 
|- align="center" bgcolor="#CCFFCC"
|33||W||December 19, 2002||3–1 || align="left"| @ New York Rangers (2002–03) ||15–12–4–2||36 || 
|- align="center" bgcolor="#CCFFCC"
|34||W||December 21, 2002||6–2 || align="left"|  Buffalo Sabres (2002–03) ||16–12–4–2||38 || 
|- align="center" bgcolor="#FFBBBB"
|35||L||December 23, 2002||1–3 || align="left"| @ New York Islanders (2002–03) ||16–13–4–2||38 || 
|- align="center" bgcolor="#FF6F6F"
|36||OTL||December 27, 2002||2–3 OT|| align="left"| @ Ottawa Senators (2002–03) ||16–13–4–3||39 || 
|- align="center" bgcolor="#FFBBBB"
|37||L||December 28, 2002||2–3 || align="left"| @ Pittsburgh Penguins (2002–03) ||16–14–4–3||39 || 
|- align="center"
|38||T||December 31, 2002||1–1 OT|| align="left"| @ Calgary Flames (2002–03) ||16–14–5–3||40 || 
|-

|- align="center" bgcolor="#FFBBBB"
|39||L||January 2, 2003||2–3 || align="left"| @ Vancouver Canucks (2002–03) ||16–15–5–3||40 || 
|- align="center" bgcolor="#FF6F6F"
|40||OTL||January 4, 2003||4–5 OT|| align="left"| @ Edmonton Oilers (2002–03) ||16–15–5–4||41 || 
|- align="center" bgcolor="#FFBBBB"
|41||L||January 7, 2003||2–3 || align="left"| @ New Jersey Devils (2002–03) ||16–16–5–4||41 || 
|- align="center" bgcolor="#CCFFCC"
|42||W||January 9, 2003||3–2 || align="left"|  New York Rangers (2002–03) ||17–16–5–4||43 || 
|- align="center" bgcolor="#FFBBBB"
|43||L||January 11, 2003||2–3 || align="left"|  Buffalo Sabres (2002–03) ||17–17–5–4||43 || 
|- align="center" bgcolor="#CCFFCC"
|44||W||January 13, 2003||4–2 || align="left"|  Calgary Flames (2002–03) ||18–17–5–4||45 || 
|- align="center" bgcolor="#FFBBBB"
|45||L||January 15, 2003||0–1 || align="left"| @ Atlanta Thrashers (2002–03) ||18–18–5–4||45 || 
|- align="center" bgcolor="#FFBBBB"
|46||L||January 16, 2003||1–4 || align="left"| @ Philadelphia Flyers (2002–03) ||18–19–5–4||45 || 
|- align="center" bgcolor="#FF6F6F"
|47||OTL||January 18, 2003||2–3 OT|| align="left"|  Toronto Maple Leafs (2002–03) ||18–19–5–5||46 || 
|- align="center" bgcolor="#CCFFCC"
|48||W||January 20, 2003||3–2 || align="left"| @ Florida Panthers (2002–03) ||19–19–5–5||48 || 
|- align="center"
|49||T||January 22, 2003||2–2 OT|| align="left"| @ Tampa Bay Lightning (2002–03) ||19–19–6–5||49 || 
|- align="center"
|50||T||January 25, 2003||1–1 OT|| align="left"|  Washington Capitals (2002–03) ||19–19–7–5||50 || 
|- align="center" bgcolor="#CCFFCC"
|51||W||January 26, 2003||4–3 || align="left"|  Chicago Blackhawks (2002–03) ||20–19–7–5||52 || 
|- align="center" bgcolor="#CCFFCC"
|52||W||January 28, 2003||6–3 || align="left"|  Florida Panthers (2002–03) ||21–19–7–5||54 || 
|- align="center" bgcolor="#FFBBBB"
|53||L||January 30, 2003||1–3 || align="left"| @ New York Islanders (2002–03) ||21–20–7–5||54 || 
|-

|- align="center" bgcolor="#FFBBBB"
|54||L||February 4, 2003||3–4 || align="left"|  Atlanta Thrashers (2002–03) ||21–21–7–5||54 || 
|- align="center" bgcolor="#FFBBBB"
|55||L||February 6, 2003||3–6 || align="left"| @ Boston Bruins (2002–03) ||21–22–7–5||54 || 
|- align="center" bgcolor="#FFBBBB"
|56||L||February 8, 2003||1–3 || align="left"| @ Toronto Maple Leafs (2002–03) ||21–23–7–5||54 || 
|- align="center" bgcolor="#CCFFCC"
|57||W||February 9, 2003||2–0 || align="left"| @ Washington Capitals (2002–03) ||22–23–7–5||56 || 
|- align="center" bgcolor="#CCFFCC"
|58||W||February 11, 2003||3–1 || align="left"|  Boston Bruins (2002–03) ||23–23–7–5||58 || 
|- align="center" bgcolor="#FF6F6F"
|59||OTL||February 13, 2003||1–2 OT|| align="left"|  Columbus Blue Jackets (2002–03) ||23–23–7–6||59 || 
|- align="center" bgcolor="#CCFFCC"
|60||W||February 15, 2003||3–2 || align="left"|  Edmonton Oilers (2002–03) ||24–23–7–6||61 || 
|- align="center" bgcolor="#FFBBBB"
|61||L||February 18, 2003||0–3 || align="left"|  Florida Panthers (2002–03) ||24–24–7–6||61 || 
|- align="center" bgcolor="#FF6F6F"
|62||OTL||February 19, 2003||1–2 OT|| align="left"| @ Buffalo Sabres (2002–03) ||24–24–7–7||62 || 
|- align="center" bgcolor="#FFBBBB"
|63||L||February 22, 2003||3–5 || align="left"|  Toronto Maple Leafs (2002–03) ||24–25–7–7||62 || 
|- align="center" bgcolor="#FFBBBB"
|64||L||February 24, 2003||1–4 || align="left"| @ Washington Capitals (2002–03) ||24–26–7–7||62 || 
|- align="center" bgcolor="#FFBBBB"
|65||L||February 27, 2003||3–6 || align="left"|  Minnesota Wild (2002–03) ||24–27–7–7||62 || 
|-

|- align="center"
|66||T||March 1, 2003||1–1 OT|| align="left"|  Vancouver Canucks (2002–03) ||24–27–8–7||63 || 
|- align="center" bgcolor="#FFBBBB"
|67||L||March 5, 2003||1–3 || align="left"| @ Mighty Ducks of Anaheim (2002–03) ||24–28–8–7||63 || 
|- align="center" bgcolor="#FF6F6F"
|68||OTL||March 6, 2003||3–4 OT|| align="left"| @ San Jose Sharks (2002–03) ||24–28–8–8||64 || 
|- align="center" bgcolor="#FFBBBB"
|69||L||March 8, 2003||1–2 || align="left"| @ Los Angeles Kings (2002–03) ||24–29–8–8||64 || 
|- align="center" bgcolor="#CCFFCC"
|70||W||March 10, 2003||3–1 || align="left"| @ Nashville Predators (2002–03) ||25–29–8–8||66 || 
|- align="center" bgcolor="#CCFFCC"
|71||W||March 12, 2003||4–0 || align="left"| @ Florida Panthers (2002–03) ||26–29–8–8||68 || 
|- align="center" bgcolor="#CCFFCC"
|72||W||March 13, 2003||4–2 || align="left"| @ Atlanta Thrashers (2002–03) ||27–29–8–8||70 || 
|- align="center" bgcolor="#FFBBBB"
|73||L||March 15, 2003||1–2 || align="left"|  Tampa Bay Lightning (2002–03) ||27–30–8–8||70 || 
|- align="center" bgcolor="#FFBBBB"
|74||L||March 18, 2003||0–1 || align="left"|  New Jersey Devils (2002–03) ||27–31–8–8||70 || 
|- align="center" bgcolor="#FFBBBB"
|75||L||March 20, 2003||3–6 || align="left"|  New York Islanders (2002–03) ||27–32–8–8||70 || 
|- align="center" bgcolor="#CCFFCC"
|76||W||March 22, 2003||5–3 || align="left"|  Carolina Hurricanes (2002–03) ||28–32–8–8||72 || 
|- align="center" bgcolor="#FF6F6F"
|77||OTL||March 25, 2003||3–4 OT|| align="left"|  Washington Capitals (2002–03) ||28–32–8–9||73 || 
|- align="center" bgcolor="#FFBBBB"
|78||L||March 28, 2003||1–4 || align="left"| @ Buffalo Sabres (2002–03) ||28–33–8–9||73 || 
|- align="center" bgcolor="#FFBBBB"
|79||L||March 29, 2003||1–3 || align="left"|  Ottawa Senators (2002–03) ||28–34–8–9||73 || 
|- align="center" bgcolor="#CCFFCC"
|80||W||March 31, 2003||4–0 || align="left"| @ Carolina Hurricanes (2002–03) ||29–34–8–9||75 || 
|-

|- align="center" bgcolor="#FFBBBB"
|81||L||April 2, 2003||1–2 || align="left"| @ Tampa Bay Lightning (2002–03) ||29–35–8–9||75 || 
|- align="center" bgcolor="#CCFFCC"
|82||W||April 5, 2003||5–4 || align="left"|  New York Rangers (2002–03) ||30–35–8–9||77 || 
|-

|-
| Legend:

Player statistics

Scoring
 Position abbreviations: C = Centre; D = Defence; G = Goaltender; LW = Left Wing; RW = Right Wing
  = Joined team via a transaction (e.g., trade, waivers, signing) during the season. Stats reflect time with the Canadiens only.
  = Left team via a transaction (e.g., trade, waivers, release) during the season. Stats reflect time with the Canadiens only.

Goaltending
  = Left team via a transaction (e.g., trade, waivers, release) during the season. Stats reflect time with the Canadiens only.

Awards and records

Awards

Transactions
The Canadiens were involved in the following transactions from June 14, 2002, the day after the deciding game of the 2002 Stanley Cup Finals, through June 9, 2003, the day of the deciding game of the 2003 Stanley Cup Finals.

Trades

Players acquired

Players lost

Signings

Draft picks
Montreal's draft picks at the 2002 NHL Entry Draft held at the Air Canada Centre in Toronto, Ontario.

See also
 2002–03 NHL season

Notes

References

Montreal Canadiens seasons
Montreal Canadiens season, 2002-03
Montreal